Hodal is a town and a municipal council in Palwal district in the Haryana state of India.

Hodal is a Haryana Legislative Assembly constituency segment, within the Faridabad Lok Sabha constituency.

Demographics
As of the 2001 India census, Hodal had a population of 55,306. Males constituted 53% of the population and females 47%. Hodal has an average literacy rate of 57%, lower than the national average of 59.5%: male literacy is 67%, and female literacy is 46%. In Hodal, 18% of the population is under 6 years of age.

See also 
 Girraj Kishore Mahaur, former MLA of Hodal
 Hasanpur
 Bahin
 Hathin

References

External links
 Unknown Antiquities of Hodal - TribuneIndia.com

Faridabad
Cities and towns in Palwal district